The Haitian Press Federation is a media organisation in Haiti, an umbrella organisation for various Haitian press organisations. Its president is currently Ady Jean-Gardy.

Mass media in Haiti
Business organizations based in Haiti
Newspaper associations